The Three Rivers Rambler is an excursion train in Knoxville, Tennessee along the Tennessee River. The train is operated by the Knoxville and Holston River Railroad, a subsidiary of Gulf and Ohio Railways.

Course
The ride starts at a depot located at 2560 University Commons Way. The train heads out towards the river, going past the County Building, and under the Henley Street and Gay Street Bridges. The train passes the Star of Knoxville riverboat and the locomotive's watertower and shed at the end of Volunteer Landing, where it parallels the Knox County Greenways down the river to the Governor Ned McWherter Riverside Landing Park. Beyond McWherter Park the train goes through the General Shale Brick Company and the Knoxville Utilities Board water treatment plant. The train then follows the river for a ways past Knoxville Downtown Island Airport, before turning away from the river and going towards McNutt Farm. It then proceeds under the Riverside Drive overpass and past the Hines Compost Company. The train then reaches the Three Rivers Trestle (also known as the Forks of the River Bridge and built in 1913), where the French Broad River and the Holston River come together to form the Tennessee River. After the trestle is crossed, the Rambler heads back into town along the same tracks. The trip takes an average of 90 minutes.

Equipment

Washington & Lincolnton #203
Washington & Lincolnton #203, Lindy, was built in 1925 by the Baldwin Locomotive Works of Philadelphia, Pennsylvania. She is a 2-8-0 Consolidation built for the Washington & Lincolnton Railroad in Georgia. In 1932, the W&L went out of business so the 203 was sold to the Rockton & Rion Railroad in South Carolina. But because she proved she wasn't up to the heavy loads, she was placed in storage in Rockton. Occasionally she would be brought out to switch freight cars in Anderson Quarry. She last ran in the 1960s. In 1977, #203 was sold to the Trilby, San Antonio & Cypress Railroad, known as the Orange Belt Route, a tourist line in Florida. In 1983, #203 was sold to the Mississippi Railway & Transportation Museum. In 1990, the engine was sold to the Waccamaw Coast Line Railroad. By 1995, #203 once again was sold to Gulf & Ohio Railways and was restored in 1999. She is set to run on select days of the year and the Christmas Express in November and December. The 203 is currently out for the 1472 FRA inspection.

San Antonio and Aransas Pass #60
San Antonio and Aransas Pass Railway #60 is a 4-4-0 built by Baldwin Locomotive Works in 1923.  The railroad was merged into Southern Pacific Railroad subsidiary Texas and New Orleans Railroad who renumbered the engine to #220.  Paulsen Spence eventually bought the engine for his Louisiana Eastern Railroad, and initially numbered as 2.  The engine was briefly renumbered as the second #1 until 1963, when it was sold to the Stone Mountain Scenic Railroad, who had also previously bought the LE's original #1.  Stone Mountain restored the engine to its original SA&AP number and named it the Texas II.  The engine operated until 1983, when it came in need of boiler work and other mechanical issues, though it continued to occasionally "pull" the train while pushed by a diesel until 2002.  Afterwards, the engine remained in the Stone Mountain rail yard until donated to the Gulf & Ohio in 2013.  The engine is currently awaiting restoration.

Southern Railway #154
Southern Railway #154 is a 2-8-0 built by Schenectady Locomotive Works in 1890. She was donated to the city of Knoxville after her retirement in August 1953. In 2008 she was donated to Gulf & Ohio Railways for restoration. She began pulling trains on July 3, 2010. She was one of the last steam locomotives to work in Knoxville.

Three Rivers Rambler #9
Locomotive #9 is a rare EMD SW600 built in 1954. She used to be the primary power for the Rambler until the end of the 2008 season because of unreliability, so she was sent to the K&HR's K line south of the river. She still wears her Three Rivers Rambler lettering and can often be seen from Volunteer Landing across the river at Holston Gases.

Trustworthy #838
1932-Coach Car built by Bethlehem Shipbuilding Company (Bethlehem Steel) for the Reading Company. Operated originally in Philadelphia and its surrounding suburbs as a commuter car. Retired in the 1990s.

Intrepid #879
1931-Coach Car; built by Bethlehem Shipbuilding Company (Bethlehem Steel) for the Reading Company. Operated originally in Philadelphia and its surrounding suburbs as a commuter car. Retired in the 1990s. Includes "walk over" seats (seat backs flip/reverse direction) so passengers can face forward on the return leg of the trip.

Resourceful
1932-Contains restrooms, concessions, and a gift shop. Built by Bethlehem Shipbuilding Company (Bethlehem Steel) for the Reading Company. Operated originally in Philadelphia and its surrounding suburbs as a commuter car. Retired in the 1990s.

Forthright
1940-Open air car, converted from freight car.

Desire
A caboose. No longer in service.

References

External links

 http://www.threeriversrambler.com/
 http://www.southern154.com/
 http://www.gulfandohio.com/

 
Heritage railroads in Tennessee
Transportation in Knoxville, Tennessee
Tourist attractions in Knoxville, Tennessee